Romantique is the second studio album by Australian recording artist Rachael Leahcar, who finished third on the first season of  The Voice Australia. The album was released on 26 April 2013, through Universal Music Australia and peaked at number 10 on the ARIA Charts, becoming Leahcar second top ten album.

Track listing

Charts

Weekly charts

Year-end charts

Release history

References

Rachael Leahcar albums
Universal Music Australia albums
2013 albums